Loctite is an American   brand of adhesives, sealants, surface treatments, and other industrial chemicals that include acrylic, anaerobic, cyanoacrylate, epoxy, hot melt, silicone, urethane, and UV/light curing technologies. Loctite products are sold globally and are used in a variety of industrial and hobbyist applications.

History
In 1953, American Schwenkfelder professor Vernon K. Krieble developed anaerobic threadlocking adhesives in his basement laboratory at Trinity College in Hartford, Connecticut. Krieble’s company, American Sealants, founded the Loctite brand, which was promoted as ushering in a new era of mechanical reliability by eliminating the vibrational loosening of mechanical fasteners, a frequent cause of machine failure.  In 1956, the name Loctite was chosen by Krieble’s daughter-in-law, Nancy Brayton Krieble. The Loctite sealant made its official public debut at a press conference at the University Club of New York on July 26 of that year.

In 1963, American Sealants changed its name to the Loctite Corporation. After Vernon Krieble's death in 1964, his son Robert H. Krieble, also a chemist, served as chief executive until 1985. The Vernon K. Krieble Foundation was established in 1984 in honor of the co-founder.

In 1964, Loctite introduced cyanoacrylate adhesives (a repackaged Eastman product, developed at Tennessee Eastman/Eastman Chemical in 1942, and originally marketed as "Eastman 910"), later known as “Super Glue”.   It was the first of many new products, including silicones, epoxies, acrylics, and the development of new Loctite anaerobics.  The 1980s brought about the addition of a line of micro anaerobic adhesives.

In 1997, Loctite was acquired as a flagship brand by Henkel, a German Fortune 500 company.  Since then, Loctite has remained a primary Henkel brand and a supplier of household adhesives, epoxies, spray adhesives, construction adhesives, home repair, sealants, and fillers.  In recent years, the company has increased its focus on green and sustainable technologies.

Products

Products made with Loctite branding include:

 Bonding adhesives, such as cyanoacrylates, epoxies, and hot melts 
 Protective coatings for industrial equipment
 Flooring and concrete repair sealants and topcoats
 Gasketing and sealing products
 Industrial anti-seize and lubricating products
 Machining compounds that supplement cutting, smoothing, and finishing processes
 Potting and encapsulating products to reinforce housed assemblies
 Repairing, rebuilding, and restoring
 Retaining compounds for non-threaded cylindrical assemblies
 Surface preparation products such as cleaners and degreasers
 Threadlockers and thread sealants in anaerobic liquid and semi-solid formulations
 Medical applications (adhesives, dispensing equipment, curing systems)
 Adhesive equipment (controllers, reservoirs, applicators, valves, dispensing systems, pumps, monitoring systems).
 Solder pastes

References

Further reading 

 The Loctite Story by Kenneth W. Butterworth. New York: Newcomen Society of the United States, 1988.
 Chapman, Peter, "Henkel Seeks Rest of Loctite in Adhesives Industry Push", Chemical Market Reporter, November 4, 1996, p. 1.
 Drop by drop: the Loctite story, 1953-1980, by Ellsworth S. Grant. Loctite Corp., 1983 LOC #83-80637.
 Giragosian, Newman H., "Successful Product & Business Development", New York: Marcel Dekker, Inc., 1978.
 Hulstein, Calvin, "Assembling with Anaerobics", Chemtech, October 1980.
 Kiesche, Elizabeth S., "Loctite Secures a Grip in a Broader Market; Applying Technology, Marketing Expertise Worldwide", Chemical Week, March 3, 1993, p. 37.
 McClenahen, John S., "Robert Krieble's Capitalist Crusade," Industry Week, April 6, 1992.
 Wantuck, Mary-Margaret, “Drop by drop, his firm won worldwide success; how Loctite became a leader in liquid adhesives”, Nation's Business, July 1984.
 Woods, Wilton, "Sticky Stuff", Fortune, March 6, 1995, p. 24.

External links 

 Loctite Worldwide
 Loctite Corporation on Encyclopedia.com
 Loctite Company History

Henkel brands
Adhesives
American brands